Stirlingia tenuifolia is a herb or shrub endemic to Western Australia.

It blooms between September and November producing yellow-cream flowers.

It is found on dunes, sand plains, swamps and hillsides in the South West, Great Southern and Goldfields-Esperanceregions of Western Australia where it grows in sandy-gravelly soils.

References

Eudicots of Western Australia
tenuifolia
Endemic flora of Western Australia
Plants described in 1841